Earl Carlton "Ty" Tyree (March 4, 1890 – May 17, 1954) was a Major League Baseball player. Tyree played for Chicago Cubs in the 1914 season. He only played in one game in his one-year career, having no hits in four at-bats. Tyree was born in Huntsville, Illinois, and died in Rushville, Illinois.

External links

Chicago Cubs players
1890 births
1954 deaths
Baseball players from Illinois
Erie Sailors players
Quincy Gems players
Atlanta Crackers players
Champaign Velvets players
People from Schuyler County, Illinois